One third of Harrogate Borough Council in North Yorkshire, England was elected each year, followed by one year without election. Since the last boundary changes in 2002, 54 councillors have been elected from 35 wards.  The last elections were held in 2018, and no further elections will be held.  Harrogate Borough Council will be abolished on 31 March 2023 and its functions transferred to the new North Yorkshire Council.  The first elections to the North Yorkshire Council took place on 5 May 2022, when 21 councillors were elected from 21 divisions in the Borough of Harrogate.

Political control
Since the foundation of the council in 1973 political control of the council has been held by the following parties:

Leadership
The leaders of the council since 2005 have been:

Council elections
1973 Harrogate Borough Council election
1976 Harrogate Borough Council election
1979 Harrogate Borough Council election
1983 Harrogate Borough Council election (New ward boundaries)
1984 Harrogate Borough Council election
1986 Harrogate Borough Council election
1987 Harrogate Borough Council election
1988 Harrogate Borough Council election
1990 Harrogate Borough Council election
1991 Harrogate Borough Council election
1992 Harrogate Borough Council election (Borough boundary changes took place but the number of seats remained the same)
1994 Harrogate Borough Council election (Borough boundary changes took place but the number of seats remained the same)
1995 Harrogate Borough Council election
1996 Harrogate Borough Council election
1998 Harrogate Borough Council election
1999 Harrogate Borough Council election
2000 Harrogate Borough Council election
2002 Harrogate Borough Council election (New ward boundaries reduced the number of seats by 5)
2003 Harrogate Borough Council election
2004 Harrogate Borough Council election
2006 Harrogate Borough Council election
2007 Harrogate Borough Council election
2008 Harrogate Borough Council election
2010 Harrogate Borough Council election
2012 Harrogate Borough Council election
2014 Harrogate Borough Council election
2015 Harrogate Borough Council election
2016 Harrogate Borough Council election
2018 Harrogate Borough Council election

Borough result maps

By-election results

1997-2001

2001-2005

2005-2010

2010-2018

Previous councillor in Woodfield had been elected as a Liberal Democrat and then defected to the Conservatives.

2018-2023

References

 By-election results

External links
Harrogate Borough Council

 
Politics of the Borough of Harrogate
Council elections in North Yorkshire
District council elections in England